Xojeli, also Khodzheyli, is a city and seat of Xojeli District in Karakalpakstan in Uzbekistan. It lies 15 km southwest of Nukus, and 25 km northeast of Konye-Urgench (Turkmenistan). Its population is 67,800 (2016). Xoʻjayli has a railway station on the line from Atyrau (western Kazakhstan) to Tashkent.

References

Populated places in Karakalpakstan
Cities in Uzbekistan